The 1990–91 Meistriliiga season was the first season of the Meistriliiga, the top level of ice hockey in Estonia. Five teams participated in the league, and Kreenholm Narva B won the championship.

Standings

External links
Estonian Ice Hockey Association

Meistriliiga
Meistriliiga (ice hockey) seasons
Meist